The law of North America is diverse and influential. The law of the United States has worldwide renown, in its codified constitution, and bill of rights, while the law of Cuba differs vastly in its regulation of private property. The first court of justice was established in Newfoundland and Labrador, Canada in 1615 by Sir Richard Whitbourne as a court of admiralty at the future site of Trinity, Newfoundland and Labrador.

List of countries

 Law of Antigua and Barbuda
 Law of Bahamas 
 Law of Barbados 
 Law of Belize 
 Law of Canada 
 Law of Costa Rica 
 Law of Cuba
 Law of Dominica 
 Law of Dominican Republic 
 Law of El Salvador 
 Law of Grenada 
 Law of Guatemala
 Law of Haiti 
 Law of Honduras 
 Law of Jamaica 
 Law of Mexico 
 Law of Nicaragua 
 Law of Panama 
 Law of Saint Kitts and Nevis 
 Law of Saint Lucia 
 Law of Saint Vincent and the Grenadines 
 Law of Trinidad and Tobago 
 Law of the United States

List of dependencies and territories
 Law of Anguilla 
 Law of Aruba 
 Law of Bermuda 
 Law of the British Virgin Islands 
 Law of Cayman Islands 
 Law of Greenland 
 Law of Guadeloupe 
 Law of Martinique 
 Law of Montserrat 
 Law of Navassa Island 
 Law of Netherlands Antilles 
 Law of Puerto Rico 
 Law of Saint-Pierre and Miquelon 
 Law of Turks and Caicos Islands 
 Law of U.S. Virgin Islands

See also
 Legal systems of the world

References

 
Legal systems